Trevor Daley (born October 9, 1983) is a Canadian former professional ice hockey defenceman, currently serving as a hockey operations advisor for the Pittsburgh Penguins of the National Hockey League (NHL). He played sixteen seasons in the NHL for the Dallas Stars, Chicago Blackhawks, Pittsburgh Penguins and Detroit Red Wings. He won two Stanley Cups both with the Penguins in 2016, and 2017.

Playing career

Daley was drafted by the Dallas Stars in the 2002 NHL Entry Draft, 43rd overall, in the second round from the Sault Ste. Marie Greyhounds of the Ontario Hockey League.

In his final year with the Greyhounds and as captain, Daley found himself the victim of a racial slur by then Coach and General Manager, former NHL goaltender John Vanbiesbrouck. Daley quit the team and upon the resignation of Vanbiesbrouck returned to the team three days later to finish out the 2002–03 season.

Daley made his NHL debut with the Stars in the 2003–04 season and established himself as a regular in the 2005–06 season when he played in a career-high 81 games and was named to the Canadian squad for the 2006 World Championships.

He played his 500th career NHL game on October 8, 2011, all with the Dallas Stars.

On July 10, 2015, Daley and teammate Ryan Garbutt were traded to the Blackhawks in exchange for Patrick Sharp and Stephen Johns.

On December 14, 2015, he was traded to the Pittsburgh Penguins in exchange for Rob Scuderi. Daley scored his first goal with the Penguins on December 18, 2015 against the Boston Bruins. Daley was injured on May 20, 2016 and missed the remainder of the 2016 Stanley Cup playoffs, after suffering a broken left ankle in Game 4 of the Eastern Conference Final against the Tampa Bay Lightning. Daley won his first Stanley Cup when the Penguins defeated the Sharks in six games in the 2016 Stanley Cup Finals.

On February 23, 2017, Daley underwent arthroscopic knee surgery following an injury during a game against the Carolina Hurricanes on February 21. Daley was expected to miss six weeks of play. He returned to the ice to play against the New Jersey Devils on April 6. He won his second straight Stanley Cup on June 11, 2017 when the Pittsburgh Penguins defeated the Nashville Predators.

On July 1, 2017, Daley signed a three-year contract with the Detroit Red Wings worth $9.534 million. On December 23, 2018, Daley played in his 1,000th career NHL game, becoming the 330th player in league history to reach the milestone.

On June 8, 2020, Daley became an inaugural executive board member the Hockey Diversity Alliance, whose goal is to address intolerance and racism in hockey.

After not playing ice hockey for more than a year and having accepted several executive roles in the sport, Daley signed with the Florida Everblades of the ECHL on January 6, 2022.

Post-playing career
On October 26, 2020, Daley announced his retirement from professional hockey, and joined the Penguins' front office as a hockey operations advisor. In 2021, Daley was a member of an ownership group that purchased the Soo Thunderbirds of the Northern Ontario Junior Hockey League.

Career statistics

Regular season and playoffs

International

Awards and honours

See also
Black players in ice hockey

References

External links

1983 births
Black Canadian ice hockey players
Canadian ice hockey defencemen
Canadian people of Jamaican descent
Chicago Blackhawks players
Dallas Stars draft picks
Dallas Stars players
Detroit Red Wings players
Hamilton Bulldogs (AHL) players
Living people
Pittsburgh Penguins players
Sault Ste. Marie Greyhounds players
Ice hockey people from Toronto
Stanley Cup champions
Utah Grizzlies (AHL) players